Shi'a Islam in Indonesia represents a small minority in that largely-Sunni Muslim country. Around one million Indonesians are Shias, who are concentrated around Jakarta. Indonesian Shia are found in areas of Java, Madura and Sumatra.

History
Banda Aceh in Acheh, in the north of Sumatra, was the original centre for Shias in Indonesia; it was from there the Shia faith spread across Indonesia.

Communities
Among the Indonesian communities which practise Shiism are minority segments of the Hadrami, Arab-descended Indonesians, who have a "small, but increasing, minority of Shia followers." Another group are the Shia of Pariaman and Bengkulu in Sumatra, and Sigli in Aceh, who claim descent from Indian sepoys, and are known as orang sipahi or orang Kling. The orang sipahi traditionally practise the Shia tabut ritual, though in Aceh it has been banned since 1953.

Persecution
The 2010 report to the United States Congress by the United States Commission on International Religious Freedom noted attacks against the Shia communities in Indonesia, particularly in East Java and Madura in 2008. In one incident in Madura, local villagers surrounded Shia houses and demanded they desist religious activities, but the crowd was dispersed by local leaders and clergy.

See also
Tabuik, an Indonesian observance of Muharram

External links
Breaking Fast With Jakarta's Shia Muslims

References